The Men's 110 metres hurdles event at the 2013 European Athletics U23 Championships was held in Tampere, Finland, at Ratina Stadium on 12 and 13 July.

Medalists

Results

Final
13 July 2013 / 20:40
Wind: -0.4 m/s

Heats
Qualified: First 3 in each heat (Q) and 2 best performers (q) advance to the Final

Summary

Details

Heat 1
12 July 2013 / 12:10
Wind: -2.7 m/s

Heat 2
12 July 2013 / 12:18
Wind: -1.1 m/s

Participation
According to an unofficial count, 16 athletes from 15 countries participated in the event.

References

110 metres hurdles
Sprint hurdles at the European Athletics U23 Championships